Scheuern is a suburb of Gernsbach in the Rastatt district, Baden-Württemberg, Germany.

Geography 

The suburb extends south of Gernsbach on the right bank of the Murg River.

History 
The first documented mention of Scheuern is as 'zu der Schuren' in the year 1327. Formerly an independent village, Scheuern was incorporated into Gernsbach in 1936.

References

Villages in Baden-Württemberg